Javi Delgado (born 20 May 1980) is a retired Spanish-Swiss football midfielder.

References

1980 births
Living people
Swiss people of Spanish descent
Swiss men's footballers
FC Sion players
CA Osasuna B players
S.L. Benfica B players
FC Cartagena footballers
Real Murcia players
Neuchâtel Xamax FCS players
Association football midfielders
Swiss Super League players
Swiss expatriate footballers
Expatriate footballers in Portugal
Swiss expatriate sportspeople in Portugal
People from Sion, Switzerland
Sportspeople from Valais